Robert "Bob" Haigh (born 11 November 1943) is an English former rugby league footballer who played in the 1960s and 1970s, and coached in the 1970s.

Playing career

International honours
Bob Haigh won caps for England while at Wakefield Trinity in 1969 against Wales, and France, in 1970 against Wales, and won caps for Great Britain while at Wakefield Trinity in the 1968 Rugby League World Cup against Australia, and France, while at Leeds in the 1970 Rugby League World Cup against New Zealand, and Australia, and in 1971 against France, and New Zealand.

Alongside fellow Wakefield Trinity player, Ian Brooke, Bob Haigh was selected to play for Great Britain in the 1968 Rugby League World Cup in Australia and New Zealand.

Alongside fellow Leeds players, John Atkinson, Tony Fisher, Syd Hynes, Mick Shoebottom and Alan Smith, Bob Haigh was selected to play for Great Britain in the 1970 Rugby League World Cup in Great Britain.

County honours
Bob Haigh  won cap(s) for Yorkshire while at Wakefield Trinity.

Championship final appearances
Bob Haigh played right-, i.e. number 12, in Wakefield Trinity's 21-9 victory over St. Helens in the Championship Final replay during the 1966–67 season at Station Road, Swinton on Wednesday 10 May 1967, and played left-, i.e. number 11, in the 17-10 victory over Hull Kingston Rovers in the Championship Final during the 1967–68 season at Headingley Rugby Stadium, Leeds on Saturday 4 May 1968, and played, and was man of the match winning the Harry Sunderland Trophy (At 34 years, 190 days, he's the oldest player to win the trophy) in Bradford Northern's 17-8 victory over Widnes in the Championship Final during the 1977–78 season.

Challenge Cup Final appearances
Bob Haigh played left-, i.e. number 11, in Wakefield Trinity's 10-11 defeat by Leeds in the 1968 Challenge Cup "Watersplash" Final during the 1967–68 season at Wembley Stadium, London on Saturday 11 May 1968, in front of a crowd of 87,100. played right- in Leeds' 7-24 defeat by Leigh in the 1971 Challenge Cup Final during the 1970–71 season at Wembley Stadium, London on Saturday 15 May 1971, in front of a crowd of 85,514, and played left-, i.e. number 11, in the 13-16 defeat by St. Helens in the 1972 Challenge Cup Final during the 1971–72 season at Wembley Stadium, London on Saturday 13 May 1972.

County Cup Final appearances
Bob Haigh played left-, i.e. number 11, in Wakefield Trinity's 18-2 victory over Leeds in the 1964 Yorkshire County Cup Final during the 1964–65 season at Fartown Ground, Huddersfield on Saturday 31 October 1964, played right-, i.e. number 12, in Leeds' 23-7 victory over Featherstone Rovers in the 1970 Yorkshire County Cup Final during the 1970–71 season at Odsal Stadium, Bradford on Saturday 21 November 1970, and played  and was man of the match winning the White Rose Trophy in Bradford Northern's 18-8 victory over York in the 1978 Yorkshire County Cup Final during the 1978–79 season at Headingley Rugby Stadium, Leeds on Saturday 28 October 1978.

BBC2 Floodlit Trophy Final appearances
Bob Haigh played left-, i.e. number 11, in Leeds' 9-5 victory over St. Helens in the 1970 BBC2 Floodlit Trophy Final during the 1970–71 season at Headingley Rugby Stadium, Leeds on  Tuesday 15 December 1970.

Player's No.6 Trophy Final appearances
Bob Haigh played left-, i.e. number 11, in Leeds' 12-7 victory over Salford in the 1972–73 Player's No.6 Trophy Final during the 1972–73 season at Fartown Ground, Huddersfield on Saturday 24 March 1973.

References

External links
(archived by web.archive.org) Super League Grand Final Preview – Harry Sunderland Trophy
(archived by web.archive.org) Virtual Rugby League Hall of Fame – World Cup 1970
World Cup 1968
Don Fox forever 'poor lad' who missed
(archived by web.archive.org) Ray Batten Player Profile
Team of the Century
Headingley Heroes
Tricks of the trade
Silver Jubilee RL celebrations hit Leigh
Rugby Cup Final 1968

1943 births
Living people
Bradford Bulls players
England national rugby league team players
English rugby league players
Great Britain national rugby league team players
Leeds Rhinos players
Place of birth missing (living people)
Rugby league locks
Rugby league second-rows
Wakefield Trinity captains
Wakefield Trinity players
Yorkshire rugby league team players